Gary Robinson (July 7, 1948 – February 2019) was a Canadian football player who played for the BC Lions from 1969 to 1978. He previously played football at Simon Fraser University.

References

1948 births
2019 deaths
Simon Fraser University alumni
BC Lions players
Hamilton Tiger-Cats players
Canadian football defensive linemen